Leigh Brown (born 23 February 1982) is a former Australian rules football player who played for Fremantle, North Melbourne and finally Collingwood in the Australian Football League. He is a Collingwood premiership player. After the 2011 Grand Final Brown retired and was announced as Melbourne's forward coach. He is renowned for his tackling ability as well as his Utility roles.

Early life 
Brown is originally from Heyfield and played under 18 football with the Gippsland Power in the TAC Cup where he attracted the attention of talent scouts.

Brown was drafted to the Fremantle Dockers with the fifth selection in the 1999 AFL Draft.

AFL career

Fremantle 
He made his AFL debut in 2000, playing 21 out of a possible 22 games in his debut year.  He would play a further 21 games in each of the next two seasons and was named Fremantle's Best Clubman in 2001. He played 63 games at Fremantle also kicking 20 goals.

North Melbourne 
Brown moved to the North Melbourne after being traded in 2002 for selection 13, which Fremantle used to draft Byron Schammer. He continued to be solid key position player who could hold his own at both ends of the ground. Prior to 2008, Brown had played in at least 21 matches in every season of his AFL career. Brown was delisted by the Kangaroos at the end of 2008. At North Melbourne Brown played 118 games and booted 64 goals.

Collingwood 
Brown was recruited to Collingwood after the 2008 season with selection 73 in the national draft. He played 23 games for Collingwood in 2009 and kicked 10 goals.

His 2010 season was extremely productive, to the point of holding former No. 1 Draft pick Josh Fraser out of the team. He has played a variety of roles, earning him the title "Mr Fix It" from Malcolm Blight and numerous commentators. Perhaps his best effort came against St Kilda, where he booted 3 goals and lead his team to a great victory to see them take top place on the AFL ladder heading into the Finals series. Brown capped off a memorable year in 2010 by playing an important role in Collingwood's Premiership victory.

On 1 September 2011, Brown announced his retirement, effective from the end of the season.

Coaching 
In 2011, Brown accepted a role from Melbourne Football Club to be their forward line coach.
In November 2013, Brown accepted an offer to coach TAC Cup Under 18 team Gippsland Power for the 2014 season (replacing Nick Stevens).

Statistics

|- style="background-color: #EAEAEA"
! scope="row" style="text-align:center" | 2000
|
| 30 || 21 || 2 || 1 || 111 || 52 || 163 || 54 || 19 || 5 || 0.1 || 0.0 || 5.3 || 2.5 || 7.8 || 2.6 || 0.9 || 0.2
|-
! scope="row" style="text-align:center" | 2001
|
| 30 || 21 || 8 || 6 || 151 || 69 || 220 || 82 || 22 || 20 || 0.4 || 0.3 || 7.2 || 3.3 || 10.5 || 3.9 || 1.0 || 1.0
|- style="background-color: #EAEAEA"
! scope="row" style="text-align:center" | 2002
|
| 30 || 21 || 10 || 8 || 132 || 82 || 214 || 75 || 35 || 20 || 0.5 || 0.4 || 6.3 || 3.9 || 10.2 || 3.6 || 1.7 || 1.0
|-
! scope="row" style="text-align:center" | 2003
|
| 16 || 22 || 10 || 6 || 135 || 70 || 205 || 75 || 35 || 50 || 0.5 || 0.3 || 6.1 || 3.2 || 9.3 || 3.4 || 1.6 || 2.3
|- style="background-color: #EAEAEA"
! scope="row" style="text-align:center" | 2004
|
| 16 || 21 || 15 || 9 || 141 || 97 || 238 || 73 || 44 || 73 || 0.7 || 0.4 || 6.7 || 4.6 || 11.3 || 3.5 || 2.1 || 3.5
|-
! scope="row" style="text-align:center" | 2005
|
| 16 || 23 || 3 || 4 || 127 || 107 || 234 || 88 || 29 || 12 || 0.1 || 0.2 || 5.5 || 4.7 || 10.2 || 3.8 || 1.3 || 0.5
|- style="background-color: #EAEAEA"
! scope="row" style="text-align:center" | 2006
|
| 16 || 21 || 8 || 5 || 163 || 126 || 289 || 117 || 30 || 13 || 0.4 || 0.2 || 7.8 || 6.0 || 13.8 || 5.6 || 1.4 || 0.6
|-
! scope="row" style="text-align:center" | 2007
|
| 16 || 22 || 21 || 16 || 124 || 102 || 226 || 78 || 38 || 17 || 1.0 || 0.7 || 5.6 || 4.6 || 10.3 || 3.5 || 1.7 || 0.8
|- style="background-color: #EAEAEA"
! scope="row" style="text-align:center" | 2008
|
| 16 || 9 || 7 || 6 || 51 || 60 || 111 || 36 || 22 || 9 || 0.8 || 0.7 || 5.7 || 6.7 || 12.3 || 4.0 || 2.4 || 1.0
|-
! scope="row" style="text-align:center" | 2009
|
| 15 || 23 || 10 || 17 || 124 || 123 || 247 || 76 || 68 || 79 || 0.4 || 0.7 || 5.4 || 5.3 || 10.7 || 3.3 || 3.0 || 3.4
|- style="background-color: #EAEAEA"
! scope="row" style="text-align:center" | 2010
|
| 15 || 19 || 21 || 10 || 131 || 101 || 232 || 86 || 78 || 93 || 1.1 || 0.5 || 6.9 || 5.3 || 12.2 || 4.5 || 4.1 || 4.9
|-
! scope="row" style="text-align:center" | 2011
|
| 15 || 23 || 23 || 17 || 160 || 122 || 282 || 86 || 82 || 120 || 1.0 || 0.7 || 7.0 || 5.3 || 12.3 || 3.7 || 3.6 || 5.2
|- class="sortbottom"
! colspan=3| Career
! 246
! 138
! 105
! 1550
! 1111
! 2661
! 926
! 502
! 511
! 0.6
! 0.4
! 6.3
! 4.5
! 10.8
! 3.8
! 2.0
! 2.1
|}

References

External links
Leigh Brown at the Collingwood Football Club website 

Fremantle Football Club players
North Melbourne Football Club players
Collingwood Football Club players
Collingwood Football Club Premiership players
1982 births
Living people
Australian rules footballers from Victoria (Australia)
Gippsland Power players
Peel Thunder Football Club players
One-time VFL/AFL Premiership players